Bhiguraj Pathania (born 1 August 1994) is an Indian cricketer. He made his Twenty20 debut for Uttarakhand in the 2018–19 Syed Mushtaq Ali Trophy on 2 March 2019.

References

External links
 

1994 births
Living people
Indian cricketers
Uttarakhand cricketers
Place of birth missing (living people)